"Driven by You" is a song by Queen lead guitarist Brian May from his 1992 solo album, Back to the Light. It was released as a lead single in November 1991.

Promotion
Shortly before releasing it as single, May played it on the Guitar Legends concert in October 1991, having a super-group backing him: Cozy Powell on drums, Neil Murray on bass, Steve Vai on rhythm guitar, Rick Wakeman and Mike Moran on keyboards, Maggie Ryder, Miriam Stockley and Chris Thompson on backing vocals.

Release and versions
Besides the original album/single version, there are at least three additional studio versions of the song. The first, originally written for a series of television advertisements for Ford in the UK, is a shorter take with alternative lyrics; it was released as a B-side exclusive to the 12-inch single in the UK. Following the single's release, a version was produced featuring a new drum track by Cozy Powell; this version was released as B-side to the single "Too Much Love Will Kill You" and as a bonus track on the US release of Back to the Light. Finally, May recorded a short instrumental version of the song, titled "Driven by You Two"; this was released as B-side to his single "Resurrection".

"Driven by You" was included on Queen's 1999 album Greatest Hits III; and later re-released on 25 June 2021 to promote the re-release and remastering of Back to the Light (released August 2021), accompanied by a newly-edited and remastered video.

Chart performance
"Driven by You" peaked at number six on the UK Singles Chart, number nine in Portugal, number 10 in the Netherlands, number 14 in Ireland, and number 35 in Belgium. On the Eurochart Hot 100, it reached number 20. In 1993, the song charted in North America, reaching number nine on the US Billboard Album Rock Tracks chart and number 70 on the Canadian RPM Top Singles chart.

Track listings
"Just One Life" is dedicated to the memory of British actor Philip Sayer.

7-inch and cassette single
 "Driven by You" – 4:11
 "Just One Life" – 3:43

12-inch single
A1. "Driven by You" – 4:11
B1. "Just One Life" – 3:43
B2. "Just One Life" (guitar version) – 3:38
B3. "Driven by You" (Ford Ad version) – 1:30

CD single
 "Driven by You" – 4:13
 "Just One Life" – 3:38
 "Just One Life" (guitar version) – 3:38

Personnel
 Brian May – lead and backing vocals, guitar, bass guitar, keyboards, drum programming
 Design by Richard Gray
 Photography by Brian May, Simon Fowler  
 Written by Brian May

Charts

Weekly charts

Year-end charts

In popular culture
"Driven by You" was used by the Ford Motor Company in advertisements for the whole of the Ford range and included World Rally Championship footage of the Ford Sierra Sapphire Cosworth Rally Car. It was then used, at a later date, in an edited version for the launch of the Ford Escort RS Cosworth, in which the Ford Sierra Sapphire Rally car was replaced by the Ford Escort RS Cosworth; in this advertisement, Miki Biasion (a Ford rally driver at the time) compared his rally car to the road-going version.

References

External links
 Lyrics at Queen official website (from Greatest Hits III)

1991 singles
1991 songs
Brian May songs
Hollywood Records singles
Parlophone singles
Songs written by Brian May